The Nissan Quest is a minivan manufactured and marketed by Nissan for model years 1993–2017 over four generations.

The first two generations (internally designated V40 and V41) of the Quest were short-wheelbase models co-developed and manufactured with Ford, aside its badge engineered Mercury Villager. For model year 2004 and the third generation (V42), Nissan ended its joint venture with Ford, manufacturing the Quest on its own. For model year 2011, the fourth generation (RE52) became a widened variant of the Nissan Elgrand minivan and was now manufactured in Japan. For the preceding generations, the Quest loosely shared its chassis and powertrain with the Nissan Maxima.

Following the decline of minivan sales in North America, Nissan ended sales of the Quest after the 2017 model year.

First generation (V40; 1993)

In 1987, Ford and Nissan entered a joint agreement to develop an all-new vehicle to compete in the minivan segment scheduled for 1991. Development officially began later that year under the codename VX54, with the final designs being chosen in 1989. Prototypes went into initial testing in 1990 at Ford and Nissan test tracks, later real-world testing throughout 1991, with development concluding at the end of that year. On January 6, 1992, the 1993 Nissan Quest was unveiled at the North American International Auto Show in Detroit. Unusually, its design patents were subsequently filed by design chief Thomas H. Semple for Nissan Motor on March 5, 1992, rather than in advance of its introduction.

The first Nissan Quest rolled off the production line on April 14, 1992 at the Avon, Ohio plant sourced from Japanese production. While assembly took place at Ohio Assembly, initial production began in Japan and later at NMMC that August. NMMC production began in June 1992 on the main body components, with engine assembly beginning in August. The Quest was launched in September 1992 and sold 1,358 units during its first month.
The Quest was a successor to the Nissan Axxess, which was sold in the United States only in 1990 (ended production in 1989) and in Canada from 1990 to 1995. It also replaced the rear-wheel drive Vanette, also discontinued in 1990. For a short time, the Quest was sold in Japan in a right hand drive configuration at Nissan Bluebird Store locations, but due to the engine displacement and exterior dimensions exceeding Japanese Government dimension regulations sales were limited and cancelled after the facelifted version was released in 1996.

Ford required that Nissan make some design changes to the VG30E before they would agree to use it in the Villager and Quest. Changes included the addition of an oil level sensor and relocating the oil filter assembly for better access. The engine was also modified for the Quest and Villager to become a non-interference design: if the timing belt were to break, the pistons wouldn't come in contact with any open valves in the cylinders. The Quest was available as XE or GXE models. Because of manufacturing issues, Nissan had an arrangement for Ford to assemble the minivan in North America, and in turn they were allowed to rebadge it and sell it under the Mercury brand as the Villager.  Many of the interior parts, including the radio, heater controls and power windows controls were adapted from Ford, and were similar to the Ford Aerostar. This generation of the Quest and Villager was built at Ford's Ohio Assembly plant in Avon Lake, Ohio. The van shared the modified version of the VG30E from the U11, and early J30 Maximas, as well as the 4-speed automatic transmission from the Maxima.

Seating was for 7, with a removable 2-seater bench in the middle, allowing the third row bench of 3 seats to slide up (either folded up for more room or down for passengers) behind the front for more rear cargo room. The third row seat was not removable however, and the system was not improved in the 1999 redesign (on which the model was not available in Canada), so newer fold-into-the-floor seats and lightweight buckets quickly eclipsed the system. In 1993, a driver's side airbag was made standard. A passenger airbag was later added in 1995 for the 1996 model year. That year saw the introduction of changes to the front and rear fascias, as well as headlights and tail lamps and the elimination of the motorized shoulder belts.

Second generation (V41; 1999) 

For 1999, the Quest was redesigned at Nissan Design America in San Diego, California, under Diane Allen, during 1993 and 1995. The production design by Shinken Tanaka was frozen in 1995 and design patents were filed at the Japan Patent Office on November 2, 1995 under patent #1009611. The exterior was given a more aerodynamic look, and the driver's side sliding door was added (it had been absent in the three-door Quests from 1993 to 1998). With the new 3.3-liter engine, the 1999 Nissan Quest had a 0–60 mph acceleration time of 11.1 seconds. The XE trim was discontinued and the GXE was moved as the base model. Two new trim levels were also introduced: the top-of-the-line GLE and the sport model SE. This Nissan Quest model became the first Nissan minivan with four doors since the 1995 Nissan Axxess.

The 2000 Nissan Quest was tested in a competition organized by Car and Driver against the Chevrolet Venture, Toyota Sienna, Mazda MPV, and Chrysler Voyager. The Quest performed poorly and placed fifth out of the five minivans tested; the editors cited a lengthy braking distance of 220 feet from 70 mph and inflexible seating configurations (the third-row seat was not removable) as downsides, while the Quest's performance and nimble handling were cited as advantages over its competitors.

In August 2000, the 2001 Quest received various minor improvements. Styling front and rear was updated, along with new alloy wheels on all models. The entry-level GXE gained a rear stabilizer bar, while the SE received acceleration-sensitive strut valving and a strut tower brace. New interior gauges and fabrics as well as a 130-watt sound system were standard on SE and GLE. Luxury GLE models also received an in-dash six-CD changer and a wood and leather-trimmed steering wheel. An optional overhead family entertainment system replaced the former floor-mounted model, though it could still be specified for SEs and GLEs equipped with a sunroof. Front seatbelts were given pretensioners. The 2001 Quest was also slightly longer, with more cargo space than the initial models.  The 2002 Nissan Quest was not sold in Canada.  The Quest would not return to Canada until the third-generation model arrived in 2003.

By the end of this generation, both Honda and Toyota marketed solely long-wheelbase minivans. In 2001, Automotive News reported that 29,232 Nissan Quests were sold, representing a 32% decrease from the previous year. No Quest models were marketed for the 2003 model year.

Third generation (V42; 2004) 

Development began in 1999 on the V42 alongside a proposed Ford replacement. In 2000, decisions were made by Ford and Nissan to abandon the joint venture, as both the Windstar and Quest replacements were in initial development and the design process. As a result, Ford made plans to build a Mercury variant on the Windstar (WIN-96) successor's platform due in 2003 and Nissan on the Altima and Maxima platform. The design by Alfonso Albaisa was chosen in late 2000, with a concept vehicle being presented in January 2002 at NAIAS as a thinly veiled preview. Design patents were filed on December 27, 2002 and registered under D483,297 on December 9, 2003. The production third generation Quest was unveiled for the 2004 model year at the 2003 North American International Auto Show using the Nissan Altima and Nissan Maxima platform, Nissan's FF-L platform, in a package slightly longer than the Chrysler long-wheelbase minivans. Production was moved to a new plant in Canton, Mississippi and started on May 27, 2003.

The Quest is powered by the 3.5 L VQ35DE engine from the Maxima, Altima, and others. The 2004 Quest recorded a 0-60 mph acceleration time of 8.8 seconds. The Quest has a flat folding rear bench and the two middle chairs fold nearly flat into the floor. Its appearance shows many similarities to the Renault Espace which appeared in 2002.

The third generation Quest features an unusual moonroof glass arrangement with separate panels above each passenger with individual retractable sunshades, while the roof above the passengers accommodates 2 DVD screens with auxiliary input plug, when the VHS shaped IWCC Xl system was discontinued. Also featured in the SE model were side front airbags, curtain airbags for all rows, VSC (Vehicle Stability Control), Traction Control, dual rear power sliding doors and power rear hatch, Bose audio with RDS and folding second row seats, dual climate control, and rear backup sensors.  Nissan redesigned the front grille and the dashboard for the 2007 model.  They also moved the DVD player from under the front passenger seat to the instrument panel stack.

Production of this generation Quest ended after the 2009 model year, with Nissan stating that the automaker needed room at the Canton plant for production of a commercial vehicle based on the Nissan NV2000 concept.

National Sales figures

2003 - 23,170 (From remaining 2002 & 2004 model early sales)

2004 - 46,430

2005 - 40,357

2006 - 31,905

2007 - 28,590

2008 - 18,743

2009 -  8,564

Quest Concept 
In March 2022, a Facebook user found the V42 concept in Nashville, Tennessee waiting to be scrapped. The front end of the concept was nearly identical to the production V42, but the rear end used a different design from the production car.

Fourth generation (RE52; 2011) 

In 2010, Nissan provided five teaser images of the 2011 Quest revealing the exterior and interior. It was then unveiled at the Los Angeles Auto Show that year. The design was based on the Nissan Forum concept. The Quest also shared its styling and chassis with the JDM Nissan Elgrand, but is  wider. The Quest went on sale in North America in early 2011 as a 2011 model. 

In Japan, the Elgrand competes with the Toyota Alphard and the Honda Elysion, whereas in the American and Canadian markets, the Quest competed with the Chrysler minivans, the Kia Sedona, Toyota Sienna, and the North American Honda Odyssey. The fourth-generation Quest had been built at the Shatai, Kyūshū plant in Japan from 2010 until 2016. 

The Nissan Quest was dropped from regular production in Canada after 2014 and in the United States after the 2016 model year due to declining sales. A shortened 2017 model year was produced only as a fleet vehicle.

Marketing
To promote its release in China, the Quest was used as a free airport escort service vehicle at Beijing Nanyuan Airport and Beijing Capital International Airport for visitors traveling from those airports.

Safety
Speaking to the results of the 2014 Nissan Quest's small overlap front crash test, Insurance Institute for Highway Safety executive vice president Dave Zuby described it as "one of the worst crash tests we've ever seen." He speculated that "a person experiencing this would be lucky to ever walk normally again."

Sales

References

Bibliography
2009 Sales
Canton Plant quality problems

External links

Nissan USA Quest site
Official Quest Information Page
AutomobileMagazine-2005 Nissan Quest (review) 
QuestDriver Forum Community

Quest
Minivans
Front-wheel-drive vehicles
2000s cars
2010s cars
Cars introduced in 1992
Motor vehicles manufactured in the United States
Vehicles with CVT transmission